K'uyka (Quechua for earthworm, "dry lake", also spelled Kuillca) is a  mountain in the Bolivian Andes. It is located in the Potosí Department, Antonio Quijarro Province, Porco Municipality. It lies southwest of Yasamana and west of Ch'illa Q'awa and Anta Anta.

References 

Mountains of Potosí Department